Pakistan participated at the 2018 Summer Youth Olympics in Buenos Aires, Argentina from 6 October to 18 October 2018.

 Wrestler Inayat Ullah made history for Pakistan by winning Pakistan's first ever individual medal in the history of Youth Olympics Games. He defeated his American opponent in the bronze medal bout to ensure the podium finish.

Medalists

Competitors

Shooting

Pakistan was given a quota by the tripartite committee to compete in shooting.

Individual

Team

Weightlifting

Pakistan was given a quota by the tripartite committee to compete in weightlifting.

Wrestling

Key:
  – Without any points scored by the opponent
  – With point(s) scored by the opponent
  – Without any points scored by the opponent
  – With point(s) scored by the opponent

References

2018 in Pakistani sport
Nations at the 2018 Summer Youth Olympics
Pakistan at the Youth Olympics